Harry E. Squire (1890-1977) was a cinematographer who filmed Frank Buck’s third movie, Fang and Claw, and later photographed This is Cinerama and other features in Cinerama.

Early years
Squire worked in the film studios of Thomas Edison in the Bronx and filmed some of Edison's one reelers, as well as early sound films. Squire moved to Paramount Pictures and filmed some of the earliest documentary and newsreel films. Van Beuren Studios hired him to photograph Fang and Claw with Frank Buck.

Work on Fang and Claw
The film took nine months to make. A  python Squire was helping Buck to force into a box left a   wound on Squire's right arm.

Later career
Squire worked for Fox Movietone News, and later photographed the Cinerama features This Is Cinerama, Cinerama Holiday, Seven Wonders of the World, and Search for Paradise.

Final years
Squire lived in Eagle Bridge, New York, next door to Grandma Moses.

References

American cinematographers
People from New Jersey
1890 births
1977 deaths